The following is a list of riots and protests involving violent disorder that have occurred in Philadelphia:

 1715 riot by supporters of Reverend Francis Phillips, who had been arrested for stating he had slept with three prominent local women
 1704 Riot of Young Gentry in Philadelphia
 1726 riot against pillory and stocks
 1738 riot against restrictions on fish weirs and racks on the Schuykill River
 Philadelphia Election riot, a conflict in 1742 over the political balance between Quakers and Anglicans
 1834 Philadelphia race riot, where a white mob attacked African Americans in Moyamensing
 Pennsylvania Hall riot, an 1838 riot where a venue was attacked by anti-abolitionists
 Lombard Street riot, an 1842 riot where black freemen were attacked by an Irish Catholic mob
 Philadelphia nativist riots, in May and June 1844, against Irish Catholic immigrants
 Race riots in Philadelphia during the 1919 Red Summer, a series of riots against Southern black migration to the city
 1964 Philadelphia race riot, one of the first in the civil rights era, triggered by police brutality
 Super Bowl LII riots, where overexcited fans destroyed private property while celebrating the Philadelphia Eagles' victory
 George Floyd protests in Philadelphia in 2020

References

Philadelphia
History of Philadelphia